Amblyseius gracilis is a species of mite in the family Phytoseiidae.

References

gracilis
Articles created by Qbugbot
Animals described in 1958